Hasanabad (also Romanized as Ḩasanābād; also known as Ḩasanābād-e Rāmjerd and Hasan Abad Ramjerd) is a village in Majdabad Rural District, in the Central District of Marvdasht County, Fars Province, Iran. At the 2006 census, its population was 322, in 74 families.

References 

Populated places in Marvdasht County